Unni Nyhamar Hinkel is a Norwegian handball player. She played fifty matches for the Norway women's national handball team between 2001 and 2003. Hinkel was part of the Norwegian team which won a silver medal at the 2001 World Women's Handball Championship in Italy.

References

Living people
Norwegian female handball players
Year of birth missing (living people)
21st-century Norwegian women